Public College of Commerce, is a general degree college in Dimapur, Nagaland. It offers undergraduate courses in commerce. This college is affiliated to Nagaland University. This college was established in 1985.

Accreditation
The college is recognized by the University Grants Commission (UGC).

References

External links
https://pccdimapur.com/about-pcc/

Colleges affiliated to Nagaland University
Universities and colleges in Nagaland
Educational institutions established in 1985
1985 establishments in Nagaland